Thomas A. Guglielmo is an American historian.

Life
Thomas Angelo Guglielmo was born to Thomas Joseph and Maryloretta (Smith) Guglielmo in 1969. He grew up in Hastings-on-Hudson, New York, received a BA from Tufts University, and a Ph.D. in History from the University of Michigan in 2000.
He taught at University of Notre Dame before joining the faculty at George Washington University.

Family
His sister Jennifer Mary Guglielmo is also a historian and associate professor at Smith College. His brother Mark Vesuvio Guglielmo is a music producer, rapper/emcee, photographer, as well as president and founder of Manifest Media.

Awards
 Allan Nevins Prize from the Society of American Historians
 2004 Frederick Jackson Turner Award from the Organization of American Historians

Works

References

21st-century American historians
American male non-fiction writers
Tufts University alumni
University of Michigan alumni
University of Notre Dame faculty
New York University faculty
George Washington University faculty
1969 births
Living people
21st-century American male writers